Bapuji Memorial Higher Secondary School is a Tamil medium government aided school located in Manavalakurichi, Kanyakumari District, Tamil Nadu, India. The school was established by G. C. Sekhar in the year 1951 as a high school. And in 1979, was upgraded to a Higher Secondary School. The school was primarily a boys' school until the upgrade, after which the grades 11th and 12th are coeducation. The school was handed over to Nazareth Charles in 2006. The school was renovated by replacing the existing buildings with new ones. The self-financed coeducation English medium school (6th to 12th) was also started in the following years. The Bapuji college of education was constructed in the same campus.

See also
List of schools in India
Stella Mary's College of Engineering

References

High schools and secondary schools in Tamil Nadu
Schools in Kanyakumari district
Educational institutions established in 1951
1951 establishments in Madras State